Maneepong Jongjit (born 21 March 1991) is a Thai badminton player. He studies at Ratna Bundit University.

Career 
Maneepong Jongjit began to attract attention when he competed as a junior with Bodin Isara in men's doubles. Together they made the transition to doubles as senior competitors. Their top result came at the 2012 India Open where they defeated Ko Sung-hyun and Yoo Yeon-seong in the final. Jongjit and Isara competed together at the London 2012 Olympics, where they lost in the quarter final.

After Jongjit and Isara split up in January 2013, Jongjit continued competing in men's doubles with a new partner, Nipitphon Phuangphuapet. The pair reached the final of the 2013 Canada Open Grand Prix, facing Jongjit's former partner Isara and Isara's new partner Pakkawat Vilailak. He and his current partner were awarded the victory as their opponents were disqualified after a brawl broke out between the former partners. Jongjit and Phuangphuapet won the 2014 U.S. Open, defeating Denmark's Mathias Boe and Carsten Mogensen.

After returning from suspension in October 2013, Jongjit resumed his partnerships in men's doubles with Nipitphon Phuangphuapet and in mixed doubles with Sapsiree Taerattanachai. He continued to compete internationally until late 2014. He was entered in several tournaments in 2015, reforming his partnership with Bodin Isara but withdrew each time due to an injury to his shoulder, which finally led to him announcing his retirement in November 2015.

Achievements

Asian Championships 
Men's doubles

Southeast Asian Games 
Men's doubles

Mixed doubles

Summer Universiade 
Men's doubles

Mixed doubles

BWF World Junior Championships 
Mixed doubles

Asian Junior Championships 
Mixed doubles

BWF World Tour 
The BWF World Tour, which was announced on 19 March 2017 and implemented in 2018, is a series of elite badminton tournaments sanctioned by the Badminton World Federation (BWF). The BWF World Tour is divided into levels of World Tour Finals, Super 1000, Super 750, Super 500, Super 300 (part of the HSBC World Tour), and the BWF Tour Super 100.

Men's doubles

BWF Superseries 
The BWF Superseries, which was launched on 14 December 2006 and implemented in 2007, was a series of elite badminton tournaments, sanctioned by the Badminton World Federation (BWF). BWF Superseries levels were Superseries and Superseries Premier. A season of Superseries consisted of twelve tournaments around the world that had been introduced since 2011. Successful players were invited to the Superseries Finals, which were held at the end of each year.

Men's doubles

  BWF Superseries Finals tournament
  BWF Superseries Premier tournament
  BWF Superseries tournament

BWF Grand Prix 
The BWF Grand Prix had two levels, the Grand Prix and Grand Prix Gold. It was a series of badminton tournaments sanctioned by the Badminton World Federation (BWF) and played between 2007 and 2017.

Men's doubles

Mixed doubles

  BWF Grand Prix Gold tournament
  BWF Grand Prix tournament

BWF International Challenge/Series 
Men's doubles

Mixed doubles

  BWF International Challenge tournament
  BWF International Series tournament
  BWF Future Series tournament

Controversy 
On 21 July 2013, Jongjit and his former partner, Bodin Isara had a brawl during the change of ends of the men's doubles finals at the 2013 Canadian Open Grand Prix. Jongjit, who was partnered with Nipitphon Phuangphuapet, met Isara and his new partner, Pakkawat Vilailak in the finals. The former partners who had unresolved issues with each other prior to the match started abusing each other vocally during the first game. This led Isara to begin chasing down Jongit across the arena. As an act of self-defense while running away from Isara, Jongit swung his badminton racquet to the side of Isara's head causing his right ear to bleed and require stitches. Isara eventually caught up with Jongit, who fell to the floor on the adjacent court, and began hitting, punching and kicking him. The two were eventually broken up by Isara's partner and their coach. As a result, both players received a sanction from the Badminton World Federation and from the Badminton Association of Thailand. Isara, the more physically abusive one among the two, was banned for 2 years from participating in any international tournaments. Jongjit, who provoked Isara during the match, was banned for 3 months. In addition, Isara and Vilailak received a black card during the event meaning disqualification from the tournament and the tournament victory was awarded to Jongjit and Phuangphuapet.

Record Against Selected Opponents 
Men's doubles results with Bodin Isara against Super Series finalists, World Championships semifinalists, and Olympic quarterfinalists.

  Chai Biao & Guo Zhendong 0–2
  Cai Yun & Fu Haifeng 0–1
  Fang Chieh-min & Lee Sheng-mu 0–2
  Jonas Rasmussen & Mads Conrad-Petersen 1–1
  Muhammad Ahsan & Bona Septano 1–1
  Angga Pratama & Rian Agung Saputro 2–0
  Hirokatsu Hashimoto & Noriyasu Hirata 1–0
  Jung Jae-sung & Lee Yong-dae 0–2
  Ko Sung-hyun & Yoo Yeon-seong 3–0
  Choong Tan Fook & Lee Wan Wah 0–1
  Mohd Zakry Abdul Latif & Mohd Fairuzizuan Mohd Tazari 0–1
  Koo Kien Keat & Tan Boon Heong 0–2
  Adam Cwalina & Michał Łogosz 1–0
  Howard Bach & Tony Gunawan 1–0

Royal decoration 
 2010 -  Silver Medalist (Seventh Class) of The Most Admirable Order of the Direkgunabhorn

References 

1991 births
Living people
Maneepong Jongjit
Maneepong Jongjit
Badminton players at the 2012 Summer Olympics
Maneepong Jongjit
Badminton players at the 2010 Asian Games
Badminton players at the 2014 Asian Games
Maneepong Jongjit
Asian Games medalists in badminton
Medalists at the 2010 Asian Games
Competitors at the 2009 Southeast Asian Games
Competitors at the 2011 Southeast Asian Games
Competitors at the 2013 Southeast Asian Games
Competitors at the 2015 Southeast Asian Games
Competitors at the 2019 Southeast Asian Games
Maneepong Jongjit
Maneepong Jongjit
Southeast Asian Games medalists in badminton
Universiade gold medalists for Thailand
Universiade bronze medalists for Thailand
Universiade medalists in badminton
Medalists at the 2011 Summer Universiade
Maneepong Jongjit